Basil of Jerusalem was the Patriarch of Jerusalem of the Church of Jerusalem from 821 to 842. During his episcopate, Basil actively opposed the iconoclasm that was supported by the Byzantine emperor Theophilus.

Life
Basil, who was a follower of his predecessor Patriarch Thomas I of Jerusalem, was elected Patriarch of Jerusalem in 821. He actively opposed iconoclasm. In 836, he convened a council in Jerusalem that defended the veneration of icons. From the council, Basil sent this position of the council to emperor Theophilus in a letter carried by syncellus Michael. Theophilus, who was a confirmed iconoclast, jailed Michael upon his arrival.

In 841, Basil was able to fend off an attack on Jerusalem by the Arab rebel Abu Harb al-Mubarqa and his army of thirty thousand by buying him off.

Basil died the following year, 842, and was succeeded by Sergius I who was made the patriarch by the Arabs.

Sources
The History of the Church of Jerusalem
Basil of Jerusalem

9th-century patriarchs of Jerusalem
Melkites in the Abbasid Caliphate
842 deaths
Byzantine Iconoclasm
Palestine under the Abbasid Caliphate